Zhou Xiao (born 17 May 1999) is a Chinese footballer who currently plays for Chinese Super League side Dalian Professional.

Club career
Zhou Xiao was selected to train with Villarreal youth training camp by the Wanda Football Star project in 2012. He moved to Atlético Madrid youth and Rayo Majadahonda División de Honor, before joining Atlético Astorga in 2018. With Atlético Astorga he would be promoted to their senior team and make his debut in a league game on 25 August 2018 against SD Almazán that ended in a 6-1 victory.

In July 2019, Dalian Professional signed Zhou Xiao. He made his debut on 28 November 2019 against Tianjin Tianhai, and scored his debut goal.

Career statistics

References

External links
 

1999 births
Living people
Chinese footballers
Footballers from Sichuan
Sportspeople from Sichuan
Dalian Professional F.C. players
Chinese Super League players
Association football defenders